13th Armoured Regiment, is an armoured regiment of the Indian Army.

Formation 
The regiment was raised on 21 December 1984 at Ahmednagar under the command of Lt Col Balram Singh Mehta.The regiment was initially raised with Sikh, Rajput and South Indian squadrons, but was later converted to "All India- All Class" composition.

History 
First equipped with Vijayanta tanks, the regiment converted to T-90 tank profile in 2004. Its first operational assignment, however, was in counter-insurgency duties in Jammu and Kashmir. 

The regiment had the honour of participating in Republic Day Parades in 1987 and 2009 with Vijayanta and T-90 tanks respectively.

The regiment was presented the ‘President’s Standards’ at Babina on 19 October 2010 by the President of India, Ms Pratibha Patil.

Regimental Insignia
The regimental crest is a brass sunburst with white metal crossed lances and pennons. Number 13 is inscribed as the core of the sun and the regimental motto is inscribed in a circle around the core. Number 13 in brass is worn as shoulder titles by all personnel of the regiment.

References

Armoured and cavalry regiments of the Indian Army from 1947
Military units and formations established in 1984